Śmiłów may refer to the following places:
Śmiłów, Greater Poland Voivodeship (west-central Poland)
Śmiłów, Masovian Voivodeship (east-central Poland)
Śmiłów, Świętokrzyskie Voivodeship (south-central Poland)